Stefani is an Aromanian (Vlach) village and a community of the Meteora municipality. Before the 2011 local government reform it was part of the community of Aspropotamos, of which it was a communal district. The 2011 census recorded 60 residents in the village. The community of Stefani covers an area of 44.587 km2.

See also
List of settlements in the Trikala regional unit

References

Populated places in Trikala (regional unit)
Aromanian settlements in Greece